Etan Boritzer (born 1950) is an American writer of children’s literature who is best known for his book What is God? first published in 1989. His best selling What is? illustrated children's book series on character education and difficult subjects for children is a popular teaching guide for parents, teachers and child-life professionals.

Boritzer gained national critical acclaim after What is God? was published in 1989 although the book has caused controversy from religious fundamentalists for its universalist views. The other current books in the What is? series include: What is Love?, What is Death?, What is Beautiful?, What is Funny?, What is Right?, What is Peace?, What is Money?, What is Dreaming?, What is a Friend?, What is True?, What is a Family?, and What is a Feeling? The series is now also translated into 15 languages.
 
Boritzer was first published in 1963 at the age of 13 when he wrote an essay in his English class at Wade Junior High School in the Bronx, New York on the assassination of John F. Kennedy. His essay was included in a special anthology by New York City public school children compiled and published by the New York City Department of Education.

Boritzer now lives in Venice, California and maintains his publishing office there also. He has helped numerous other authors to get published through How to Get Your Book Published! programs. Boritzer is also a yoga teacher who teaches regular classes locally and guest-teaches nationally. He is also recognized nationally as an erudite speaker on The Teachings of the Buddha.

References

External links

Children's Literature – What is? illustrated children’s book series on character education and difficult subjects

Living people
American children's writers
1950 births